I Love the Holidays is a television special and the seventh installment of the I Love... series that premiered on VH1 on November 20, 2005. It follows the same format as VH1's I Love... where commentators talk about the holidays.

Commentators
Carlos Alazraqui
Antigone Rising (Cassidy and Kristen Henderson)
Michael Ian Black
Chris Booker
Rabbi Shmuley Boteach
Bow Wow Wow (Leigh Gorman and Annabella Lwin)
Michael Bublé
Charo
Santa Claus
Jennifer Elise Cox
Molly Culver
Stephanie D'Abruzzo
Rocco Dispirito
Simon Doonan
The Donnas (Allison Robertson and Maya Ford)
Bil Dwyer
Nicole Eggert
Rich Eisen
Elvira
Greg Fitzsimmons
Godfrey
Tyler Florence
Jake Fogelnest
Elon Gold
Genevieve Gorder
Gilbert Gottfried
Erin Gray
Luis Guzman
Rachael Harris
Marilu Henner
Mark Hoppus
Clint Howard
Scott Ian
Invisible Man
Ron Jeremy
Chris Jericho
Jake Johannsen
Jo Koy
Loni Love
Stephen Lynch
Elf Mackenzie
Kathleen Madigan
Biz Markie
Debbie Matenopoulos
Edwin McCain
Jay McCarroll
Darryl McDaniels
John Melendez
Modern Humorist (Michael Colton and John Aboud)
Billy Morrison
Jason Mraz
Mummy
Nelson
Graham Norton
Patrice O'Neal
Megyn Price
Rachel Quaintance
Mo Rocca
Darius Rucker
Dave "Snake" Sabo
Stuart Scott
Willard Scott
Sherri Shepard
Brad Sherwood
Dee Snider
Rick Springfield
Joel Stein
French Stewart
Brenda Strong
Alan Thicke
Turkey
Frank Vincent
Andrew WK
John Waters
Evan Wecksell
Lauren Weedman
Kevin Weisman
Wil Wheaton
Chris Wylde
"Weird Al" Yankovic
Cedric Yarbrough
Zero Boy

Recurring segments
 Yule Log: Three yule logs are presented but are interrupted by three Christmas songs.
 Weird Al's Holiday Survival Guide: "Weird Al" Yankovic presents the survival guides for Halloween, Thanksgiving, Hanukkah, Christmas and New Year's.
 Holiday Cheer from Patrice O'Neal: Patrice O'Neal wears an "arrow through the head".
 Santa Does Stand-Up: Santa Claus tells jokes about Christmas.

List of ideas and events
 It's a Wonderful Life
 Hell Night
 "The Chanukah Song" by Adam Sandler
 Macy's Thanksgiving Day Parade
 Halloween (previously discussed on I Love the '70s)
 Dreidels
 The First Thanksgiving
 It's the Great Pumpkin, Charlie Brown
 Hanukkah
 "Monster Mash" by Bobby "Boris" Pickett
 Rockefeller Center Christmas Tree
 How the Grinch Stole Christmas
 Elvira, Mistress of the Dark
 "Feliz Navidad" by José Feliciano
 Black Friday
 Halloween costumes
 Monsters (specifically The Invisible Man, Werewolves, Mummies, Frankenstein and Dracula)
 Fruitcake
 Latkes
 Annual presidential turkey pardon
 The Rockettes
 Thanksgiving Day
 Witches
 "Christmas in Hollis" by Run-D.M.C.
 New Year's Eve (specifically New Year's parties, New Year's resolutions, New Year's Eve in Times Square, New Year's kiss and "Auld Lang Syne")

Yule Log #1: "White Christmas"

Surviving Halloween: Hell Night, Halloween candy and Halloween costumes

Surviving Thanksgiving: turkeys, stuffing and Black Friday

Yule Log #2: "The Christmas Song"

Surviving Hanukkah: dreidels, Hanukkah gelt and presents

Holiday Cheer: Arrow Through the Head

Surviving Christmas: eggnog, mistletoe, carolers and fruitcake

Yule Log #3: "Jingle Bells"

Surviving  New Year's: alcoholic drinks, dating, countdowns and Dick Clark

Santa Does Stand-Up: The reindeer flying with rockets surgically attached to their feet, Santa Claus switching from leprechauns to elves, and elves making Santa Claus a teleporter

External links
 

VH1 original programming
2005 American television series debuts
2005 American television series endings